Kassandra may refer to:
Cassandra, in Greek mythology
114 Kassandra, an asteroid
Cassandra (novel), a book written by the East German author Christa Wolf (published 1983)
Cassandreia, an ancient city and adjoining isthmus in Chalcidice, Greece
Kassandra, Chalkidiki, a modern municipality and peninsula in Chalkidiki, Greece 
Kassandra (Assassin's Creed), a fictional character in Assassin's Creed: Odyssey
Kassandra (TV series), a Venezuelan telenovela about a gypsy maiden marrying into a rich family

See also
 Kasandra Bradette, Canadian speed skater
 Cassandra (disambiguation)